Owen Bugeja (born 20 February 1990) is a retired Maltese footballer who last played as a centre-back for Pembroke Athleta. He made one appearance for the Malta national team in 2015.

Career
Bugeja made his international debut for Malta on 11 November 2015 in a friendly against Jordan. The match, which was played in Istanbul, finished as a 0–2 loss.

Career statistics

International

References

External links
 
 
 
 

1990 births
Living people
Maltese footballers
Malta youth international footballers
Malta under-21 international footballers
Malta international footballers
Association football central defenders
Floriana F.C. players
Qormi F.C. players
Tarxien Rainbows F.C. players
Pembroke Athleta F.C. players
Maltese Premier League players